Government of Uzbekistan
Military of Uzbekistan
Uzbekistan
The National Security Council under the President of Uzbekistan is the central advisory body of the Uzbek government which aides and assists the President in implementation of military policy.

Role 
The Security Council exercises full control to exercise national security powers and forms/implements a national security policy for Uzbekistan. Meetings of the National Security Council of the Republic of Uzbekistan are held at least once a quarter. Extraordinary meetings of the Council may be convened if necessary. A session of the National Security Council may involve any security officials and diplomats. Recommendations and proposals of the National Security Council are adopted by the members of at its meetings by a simple majority and shall enter into force upon approval by the Chairman of the National Security Council. Decisions on security issues are formalized by decrees and orders of the President of the Republic of Uzbekistan.

Secretaries 

 Mir-Akbar Hoji-Akbarovich Rakhmankulov (27 November 1997-20 August 2002)
 Murad Atayev (2005-2011)
 Bakhodir Tashmatov (2011-2013)
 Viktor Makhmudov (21 September 2013-)

Members 
Permanent members of the Security Council include the following:

President
Prime Minister
 Head of the Presidential Administration
 Secretary of the Security Council
 Chairman of the National Security Committee
Foreign Minister
Minister of Defence
Heads of chambers in the Oliy Majlis
the State Security Service
Commander of the National Guard
Prosecutor General
Minister of Investments
Minister of Foreign Trade
Minister of Internal Affairs
Chairman of the Committee for State Border Protection of the National Security Service
Head of the State Committee for Defense Industry
Head of the National Human Rights Centre

See also 

 State Security Council of Turkmenistan
 Security Council of Tajikistan
 Security Council of Kyrgyzstan
 Security Council of Kazakhstan

References